The Young Poisoner's Handbook is a 1995 black comedy-drama film based on the life of Graham Young, more commonly known as "The Teacup Murderer". It was directed by Benjamin Ross and written by Ross and Jeff Rawle. The film stars Hugh O'Conor in the lead role.

Plot
Graham Young has been obsessed with death and the macabre since childhood. He is highly intelligent, with an aptitude for chemistry. He also dreams of poisoning as many people as he can. In his teen years, he poisons a schoolmate—making him ill rather than killing him—in order to date a girl his schoolmate was seeing. His conversation with his date involves vivid, graphic descriptions of deadly car accidents. He also reads a comic book account of an event in which the Dutch Resistance killed a whole German army camp in the occupied Netherlands during the Second World War by poisoning their water supply with thallium.

Graham is arrested at the age of 14 outside his home in Neasden after poisoning his father and stepmother with thallium, killing his stepmother and leaving his father seriously ill. During the struggle with police, he drops his "Exit Dose" of thallium, which he intended to use to commit suicide should he be caught. He is hospitalised for nine years in an institution for the criminally insane, during which time a psychiatrist works with him in the hopes of rehabilitating him.

Graham's dishonesty becomes evident to the doctor, who can see that Graham is trying to deceive him. Graham apparently has no dreams to share with the psychiatrist so he "borrows" a fellow prisoner's dreams. This source is shut off to him, however, once the fellow prisoner commits suicide. Despite the initial evidence of Graham's deceitfulness, the doctor eventually gets him released.

Graham then goes to work in a camera factory and is shown the secret ingredient used in the company's shutter system—thallium. It is not long before Graham starts poisoning people again. He kills two of his workmates by poisoning their tea with thallium stolen from the laboratory, and makes many others ill. For months, the source of the "bug" afflicting the workers at the factory remains a mystery until one unforeseen event leads to Graham's being found out. As a hygiene measure, all the personalised teacups are replaced with uniform ones, leaving Graham unable to poison people selectively. His efforts to memorise which cup is going to which person give him away and his workmates finally realise what is going on.

Graham is arrested soon afterwards and he is later sentenced to a lengthy custodial term, this time in an ordinary prison. He commits suicide by poisoning himself with the "Newton's Diamond" he made in the psychiatric hospital.

Cast

Hugh O'Conor – Graham Young
Tobias Arnold – Young Graham Young
Ruth Sheen – Molly
Roger Lloyd-Pack – Fred
Norman Caro – Mr Goez
Dorothea Alexander – Mrs Goez
Charlotte Coleman – Winnie
Paul Stacey – Dennis
Samantha Edmonds – Sue
Robert Dem – Mr Dextereger
Jack Deam – Mick
Peter Pacey – Dickie Boone
Joost Siedhoff – Dr Scott
Vilma Hollingbery – Aunty Panty
Frank Mills – Uncle Jack
Rupert Farley – Nurse Trent
Dirk Robertson – Nurse Hopwood
Chris Lawson – Prison Officer
Malcolm Sinclair – Dr Triefus
Charlie Creed-Miles – Berridge
Antony Sher – Dr Zeigler
Cate Fowler – Social Services Worker
John Abbott – Chair
Anna Kollenda – Baby Donna
Katja Kollenda – Baby Donna
Hazel Douglas – Edna
Arthur Cox – Ray
John Thomson – Nathan
Jean Warren – Debra
Simon Kunz – John
Frank Coda – Billy
Tim Potter – Simon
Roger Frost – Factory Manager
David Savile – Chief Medical Inspector

References

External links
 

1990s black comedy films
1990s crime films
1995 films
British black comedy films
British serial killer films
English-language French films
English-language German films
French black comedy films
French serial killer films
German black comedy films
German serial killer films
Films set in psychiatric hospitals
1995 comedy films
1990s English-language films
1990s British films
1990s French films
1990s German films